Chalmer Luman Harris (January 17, 1915 – November 11, 1996) was an American right-handed pitcher, coach, manager, and scout in Major League Baseball.

Born in New Castle, Alabama, Harris began his playing career with the Atlanta Crackers of the Southern Association in 1937. His catcher that season was Paul Richards, who in 1938 became Atlanta's player-manager. Richards and Harris would form a decades-long association in baseball at the minor and Major League levels.

Playing career
The ,  Harris compiled a 35–63 record with a 4.16 earned-run average in 151 American League games with the Philadelphia Athletics (1941–1944 and 1946) and Washington Senators (1947). He missed the 1945 season while serving in the United States Navy in the Pacific Theater of Operations during World War II. As a big leaguer, Harris allowed 874 hits and 265 bases on balls in 820 innings pitched and 151 games, with 232 strikeouts. He pitched at the Triple-A level during his last three active seasons in pro ball.

The remainder of Harris' Major League career would be spent working in tandem with Richards, initially as a coach with the Chicago White Sox (1951–1954), Baltimore Orioles (1955–1961) and Houston Colt .45s (1962–1964). In each case he worked under Richards, who was either his manager, general manager, or (in Baltimore from 1955 to 1958) both. Despite his playing background, Harris was never a pitching coach; he usually served as a third-base coach.

Manager of Astros and Braves
Harris' first managerial experience came late in the  season. On August 30, Richards stepped down as skipper of the Orioles to become the general manager of the expansion Colt .45s, and Harris took command as interim pilot on September 1. He led them to 17 wins in 27 games (.630), as Baltimore finished third in the American League.

Harris served for almost three full seasons as a Colt .45 coach under Harry Craft, until September 19, 1964, when Richards promoted him to manager. In , Harris helmed the re-christened Houston Astros, serving for the team's debut season in the Astrodome. But the 1965 Astros went only 65–97 to finish ninth in the ten-team National League and, at the end of the year, Richards was fired and Harris was replaced by Grady Hatton as the Astros' pilot.

In August 1966, Richards returned to the major leagues as the vice president for baseball operations (in effect, general manager) of the Atlanta Braves. After that season, Harris rejoined his old boss in 1967 as skipper of the Richmond Braves, Atlanta's Triple-A farm club.

Harris led Atlanta to 93 victories and the first National League West Division championship in 1969—an expansion year when both the National and American leagues grew to 12 teams and adopted divisional play for the first time. It was the franchise's first postseason berth since losing the 1958 World Series as the Milwaukee Braves; however, Harris' squad lost the 1969 National League Championship Series to the eventual world champion New York Mets in three straight games.  When the Braves slumped in ensuing years, Richards was fired during the 1972 season, on June 1; slightly more than two months later, on August 6, Harris was replaced as manager by former Braves' third baseman Eddie Mathews. Harris' final managerial record was 466–488 (.488).

Harris died due to ill effects of diabetes at age 81 in Pell City, Alabama. He is buried in Birmingham's Elmwood Cemetery.

Managerial record

References

External links
 Baseball-Reference.com – career managing record and playing statistics

1915 births
1996 deaths
Atlanta Braves managers
Atlanta Crackers players
Baltimore Orioles coaches
Baltimore Orioles managers
Baltimore Orioles (IL) players
Baseball players from Alabama
Buffalo Bisons (minor league) players
Burials at Elmwood Cemetery (Birmingham, Alabama)
Burials in Alabama
Caribbean Series managers
Charlotte Hornets (baseball) players
Chicago White Sox coaches
Deaths from diabetes
Houston Astros managers
Houston Astros scouts
Houston Colt .45s coaches
Houston Colt .45s managers
Jersey City Giants players
Louisville Colonels (minor league) players
Major League Baseball pitchers
Major League Baseball third base coaches
Minneapolis Millers (baseball) players
Minor league baseball managers
People from Jefferson County, Alabama
People from Pell City, Alabama
Philadelphia Athletics players
Senadores de San Juan players
United States Navy personnel of World War II
Washington Senators (1901–1960) players